Ferghana horses were one of China's earliest major imports, originating in an area in Central Asia. These horses, as depicted in Tang dynasty tomb figures in earthenware, may "resemble the animals on the golden medal of Eucratides, King of Bactria (Bibliothèque Nationale in Paris)."

The Ferghana horse is also known as the "heavenly horse" in China or the Nisean horse in the West.

Ancient history

As early as the Han dynasty, China projected its military power into the Indo-Greek kingdom of Dayuan, north of Bactria, a nation centered in the Ferghana Valley of present-day Central Asia. The Han imperial regime required Ferghana horses in such great numbers that the rulers of Ferghana closed their borders to such trade, resulting in the Han–Dayuan War, which China won.

In 102 AD, the Chinese required the defeated Ferghana to provide at about thirty "Superior Horses" prized for breeding and three thousand Ferghana horses of "middling or lower quality." Sinologist Arthur Waley in his article The Heavenly Horses of Ferghana made the important distinction between the two types of horses that Emperor Wu of Han had sought: the few divine ones to satisfy his spiritual needs; and the many sturdier mounts required to continuously replenish and build up his cavalry.

Chinese statuary and paintings, as well as the Bactrian coin, indicate that these horses may have had legs that were proportionally short, powerful crests, and round barrels. The forelegs of the Chinese depictions are very straight, resembling the Guoxia horse of present-day China. According to tradition, these horses sweated blood, giving rise to the name "sweats blood horse" (in ). Modern authorities believe that blood-sucking parasites caused sweat to mix with blood when the horses were worked.

Modern researchers, Mair notes, have come up with two different ideas [for the ancient Chinese references to the "Blood-sweating" horses of Ferghana]. The first suggests that small subcutaneous blood vessels burst as the horses sustained a long hard gallop. The second theorizes that a parasitic nematode, Parafilaria multipapillosa, triggered the phenomenon. P. multipapillosa is widely distributed across the Russian steppes and makes its living by burrowing into the subcutaneous tissues of horses. The resulting skin nodules bleed often, sometimes copiously, giving rise to a something veterinarians call "summer bleeding."Emperor Wu of Han China (Wudi) named the horses "Heavenly Horses" ( 113 BCE) after a divination predicted their appearance.

Sometime earlier the emperor had divined by the Book of Changes and been told that "divine horses are due to appear" from the northwest. When the Wusun came with their horses, which were of an excellent breed, he named them "heavenly horses". Later, however, he obtained the blood-sweating horses from Dayuan [= Ferghana], which were even hardier. He therefore changed the name of the Wusun horses, calling them "horses from the western extremity", and used the name "heavenly horses" for the horses of Dayuan.

Emperor Wu sent an army of 40,000 men in 104 BCE 5,000 km to Ferghana, but less than half the army reached their destination. Exhausted, they were defeated. Another army of 60,000 men was sent in 103 BCE and who breached the walls of the city and cut off the water supply after a 40 day siege. Fearing imminent defeat, the inhabitants beheaded their king and presented his head to the Han general and offered the Han to take as many horses as they wanted. After installing a new puppet King, the Han left with 3,000 horses, although only 1,000 remained by the time they reached China in 101 BCE. The Ferghana also agreed to send two Heavenly horses each year to the Emperor, and lucerne seed was brought back to China providing superior pasture for raising fine horses in China, to provide cavalry which could cope with the Xiongnu who threatened China.

The Han dynasty bronze statuette Gansu Flying Horse is most likely a depiction of this breed.

Medieval China
Ferghana were popular in China for roughly the next 1,000 years until the demand shifted to larger, stronger local breeds. Nomadic breeds like Ferghana horses were fast, tough and had high endurance, but they were smaller and leaner than local breeds. The Ferghana horse is considered to be equivalent to the Nisean horse or Turkoman horse, which are both now extinct. The Akhal-Teke horse is believed to be a descendant of the original Ferghana horse.

See also

 Horses in East Asian warfare
 Hematidrosis
 Nisean horse
 Turkoman horse

Footnotes

References
Bonavia (2004): The Silk Road From Xi’an to Kashgar. Judy Bonavia – revised by Christoph Baumer. 2004. Odyssey Publications. .
Boulnois (2004): Silk Road: Monks, Warriors & Merchants on the Silk Road. Luce Boulnois. Translated by Helen Loveday. Odyssey Books, Hong Kong. .
 Forbes, Andrew ; Henley, David (2011). 'The Heavenly Horses of the West' in: China's Ancient Tea Horse Road. Chiang Mai: Cognoscenti Books. ASIN: B005DQV7Q2
Watson, Burton, translator. (1961). Records of the Grand Historian by Sima Qian. Han Dynasty II (Revised Edition), Columbia University Press. .
Royal Asiatic Society of Great Britain and Ireland. North China Branch, Shanghai, China Branch of the Royal Asiatic Society. Journal of the North China Branch of the Royal Asiatic Society, Issues 39-41.

External links
http://chinesehoroscop-e.com/astrology/ferghana-horses.php
https://web.archive.org/web/20120329190620/http://www.wantchinatimes.com/news-subclass-cnt.aspx?id=20110922000098&cid=1103

Extinct horse breeds
History of Imperial China
Horse breeds originating in China
Horse breeds